The Hong Kong Dragon Boat Festival in New York is an annual sporting and multicultural event held in August on Meadow Lake in Flushing Meadows–Corona Park in Queens, New York to celebrate the fifth moon (or the fifth month) of the lunar calendar.  In addition to providing audiences with traditional Chinese foods and performances, the festival, now in its 18th year, hosts over 150 dragon boat teams from across North America, making it one of the largest dragon boat festivals in the United States.  Depending on the competitive division, teams compete for cash prizes or airline tickets.  

In 1986, the Hong Kong Tourism Board donated traditional teak wood boats to several cities including New York. In 1990, the locally based Hong Kong Economic and Trade Office promoted and organized the inaugural Hong Kong Dragon Boat Festival in New York, which was held on the Hudson River in Battery Park City.  Several of the original organizers are still involved with the festival, including Henry Wan, who now serves as the festival's chairman.

The festival is now an independent non-profit company organized under the laws of the State of New York and receives its funding through sponsorships by various companies.  The Hong Kong Economic and Trade Office continues to be a substantial supporter of the festival.  

In addition to the change in corporate structure, the festival's fleet of dragon boats has grown from 4 teak wood dragon boats to over 30 dragon boats.  Many of the boats are made of fiberglass.  All the boats are approved by the International Dragon Boat Federation for international dragon boat racing.

References

External links
Hong Kong Dragon Boat Festival in New York, Inc. 
International Dragon Boat Federation

Dragon boat racing
Recurring events established in 1990
Flushing Meadows–Corona Park
Sports in Queens, New York
Boat festivals